The men's Greco-Roman heavyweight competition at the 1932 Summer Olympics in Los Angeles took place from 4 August to 7 August at the Grand Olympic Auditorium. Nations were limited to one competitor. This weight class was not limited by maximum weight and was open to wrestlers above 87kg.

This Greco-Roman wrestling competition followed the same format that was introduced at the 1928 Summer Olympics, using an elimination system based on the accumulation of points. Each round featured all wrestlers pairing off and wrestling one bout (with one wrestler having a bye if there were an odd number). The loser received 3 points. The winner received 1 point if the win was by decision and 0 points if the win was by fall. At the end of each round, any wrestler with at least 5 points was eliminated.

Schedule

Results

Round 1

Hirschl had the first round bye and was the only wrestler to advance with 0 points. Both bouts were won by decision, with the winners Gehring and Westergren receiving 1 point and the losers Donati and Urban receiving 3.

 Bouts

 Points

Round 2

Hirschl won by fall, maintaining his 0 points and eliminating Donati. In the match between the two first-round winners, Gehring won by decision to pick up a second point while pushing Westergren to 4 points. Urban's bye kept him at 3 points.

 Bouts

 Points

Round 3

Hirschl received his first points, 3 for a loss to Westergren. Westergren needed to win by fall rather than decision to stay in competition; he did, remaining at 4 points. Urban picked up a fourth point by winning by decision over Gehring, who was eliminated at 5 points.

 Bouts

 Points

Final round

Urban defeated Hirschl, eliminating the latter (who took the bronze medal). Westergren and Urban were the last two wrestlers; as Westergren had previously defeated Urban, the Swede took the gold medal.

 Bouts

 Points

References

Wrestling at the 1932 Summer Olympics